Ulrich Neymeyr (born 12 August 1957 in Worms-Herrnsheim) is a German Roman-Catholic bishop.

Life 
In Mainz, Neymeyr studied Roman Catholic theology and philosophy at Johannes Gutenberg University Mainz. He became on June 12, 1982 priest. On 20 February 2003 Neymeyr was appointed as auxiliary bishop of Mainz and became titular bishop of Maraguia. Since November 22, 2014 Neymeyr is bishop of Roman Catholic Diocese of Erfurt. He followed in Erfurt bishop Joachim Wanke.
In December 2018 and again in January 2020, Neymeyr supported married priests in Roman Catholic Church.

External links 

 Diocese Erfurt: Ulrich Neymeyr
 Bishop Neymeyr on website of Roman Catholic Diocese of Mainz
 MDR.de: Kirchenvertreter und Zentralrat der Juden warnen vor Spaltung der Gesellschaft (German)
 
 RTL.de: Bischof Neymeyr warnt vor "parteilichen Machtspielen" (German)

References 

21st-century German Roman Catholic bishops
21st-century Roman Catholic bishops in Germany
1957 births
Living people